Chingari, alternatively spelled as Chingaari, is a 2012 Indian Kannada-language action thriller film starring Darshan, Bhavana and Deepika Kamaiah in the lead roles. The film is directed by A. Harsha and the music is composed by V. Harikrishna. It is also dubbed into Hindi as Chingaara. Chingari is a remake of the 2008 French-English action thriller film Taken, starring Liam Neeson in the lead role.

Premise
Dhanush is a CCB officer, who sets out to rescue his fiancée Geetha in Switzerland who is kidnapped and about to be sold into prostitution.

Cast 
 Darshan as Dhanush
 Deepika Kamaiah as Geetha
 Bhavana as Translator
 Srujan Lokesh as Srujan
 Yashas Surya
 Vera Prunn
 Richard Cobill as Jamshem
 Madhu Guruswamy as Vineesh Malhotra

Release
The movie got released in over 180+ theaters on 3 February 2012. Chingaari collected about  gross in its first day, Chingari also released in some of the Bangalore theaters which were screening only non-Kannada films with a great success. The movie broadcasts in the suvarna Kannada on the occasion of May day 2013.

Soundtrack

The audio release function of Chingaari is directed by dance director turned director Harsha.A. Sudeep made the audio release on 2 January 2012. V. Harikrishna has composed 5 songs set to the lyrics of Kaviraj, Yogaraj Bhat and Jayanth Kaikini

Reception

Critical response 

Srikanth Srinivasa from Rediff.com scored the film at 3 out of 5 stars and says "However, its portrayal of a serious issue such as human trafficking and flesh trade is superficial. Technically, it is a sound film with good special and sound effects. Deepu Kumar has edited it quite well. On the whole, the film is a good way of passing time". A critic from Bangalore Mirror wrote  "HC Venu’s cinematography is the best thing about Chingari. Some shot compositions are incredibly  brilliant. Composer Harikrishna, a Darshan regular, could not come up with his usual brilliance". A critic from NDTV wrote "Srujan Lokesh, Sumitra, Ramesh Bhat, Praveen and Yashas Surya have performed well in their respective roles. Hari's scored in background music. Chingari is a well-made film with rich production values and top rated technical work". B S Srivani from Deccan Herald wrote "Bhavana, with yet another ‘bold’ act brings to mind the fetish for commodifying women - which the film touches, but barely. This Chingari sputters out (for Darshan's mass fans) after a brief brilliance". A critic from News18 India wrote "Srujan Lokesh, Sumitra, Ramesh Bhat, Praveen and Yashas Surya have performed well in their respective roles. Hari's scored in background music. 'Chingari' is a well-made film with rich production values and top rated technical work".

Box office
Its first week gross collections crossed  6 crore, according to the distributor Prasad. The distributor's share would be about  ₹5 crore  in the first week of its release. It completed 50 days in 10 theatres.

References

External links
 

2012 films
2010s Kannada-language films
2012 action thriller films
Films scored by V. Harikrishna
Indian action thriller films
Films directed by Harsha